Theodore L. Cairns (July 20, 1914 – September 26, 1994) was an American chemist,  a member of the National Academy of Sciences, a research scientist at DuPont Central Research, known for his contributions to U.S. scientific policy and applications of chemistry.

Cairns was the director of the Central Research Department of E. I. du Pont de Nemours and Company.
He was also the chair of the Division of Chemistry and Chemical Technology of the National Research Council, on President Richard Nixon's Science Policy Task Force and Nixon's Science Advisory Committee. His daughter Margaret C. Etter became a noted chemist in her own right, conducting her research at the University of Minnesota.

Awards and distinctions 
 The City of Wilmington's Outstanding Citizen Award, 1963
 The American Chemical Society Award for Creative Work in Synthetic Organic Chemistry, 1968
 SOCMA (Society of Chemical Manufacturers Association) Medal for Creative Research in Synthetic Organic Chemistry, 1968
 Honorary Doctor of Laws degree, University of Alberta, 1970
 Perkin Medal, American section of the Society of Chemical Industry, 1973
 Elliott Cresson Medal, The Franklin Institute, 1974

Notable government assignments 
 The Delaware Governor's Council on Science and Technology, 1969-72
 President Nixon's Science Policy Task Force, 1969
 The President's Science Advisory Committee, 1970-73
 The President's Committee on the National Medal of Science, 1974-75
 The Polytechnic Institute of New York Advisory Council for Chemistry, 1976-78

References

External links
National Academy of Sciences Biographical Memoir

1914 births
1994 deaths
20th-century American chemists
Members of the United States National Academy of Sciences